Dalnyaya Polubyanka is a rural locality (a selo) and the administrative center of Dalnepolubyanskoye Rural Settlement, Ostrogozhsky District, Voronezh Oblast, Russia. The population was 401 as of 2010. There are 7 streets.

Geography 
Dalnyaya Polubyanka is located 29 km south of Ostrogozhsk (the district's administrative centre) by road. Vladimirovka is the nearest rural locality.

References 

Rural localities in Ostrogozhsky District